Don Eldridge Gorton III (May 4, 1960 – December 24, 2022) was a Massachusetts attorney who served as a state tax judge from 1997 to 2008.

Biography
Gorton was an advocate for LGBT equality in Boston for over 25 years. He was perhaps best known as the longtime co-chair of the Governor's Task Force on Hate Crime, to which he was appointed by then-Governor William Weld. The task force was given permanent status by former Governor Paul Cellucci in 1998. Gorton led the task force from 1991 until the body was disbanded by former Massachusetts Governor Mitt Romney in 2003. He led the drafting of regulations to implement the Hate Crimes Reporting Act of 1990, and spearheaded civil rights awareness activities for the Executive Office of Public Safety.

Gorton also led the Greater Boston Lesbian/Gay Political Alliance (later the Lesbian, Gay, Bisexual, and Transgender Political Alliance of Massachusetts) from 1988 to 1994, and led the Anti-Violence Project of Massachusetts beginning in 1994. Over the years he played a leading role in passage of the Gay and Lesbian Civil Rights Law and the Hate Crimes Penalties Act amendments of 1996. In the 21st century, he focused on anti-bullying advocacy. In addition to co-authoring an anti-bullying best practices guide Gorton played a leading role in the 50+ organization coalition that secured passage of comprehensive anti-bullying legislation in Massachusetts in 2010.

From 2008 to 2013, Gorton was active in the youth-led LGBT equality movement dubbed by the New York Times as "Stonewall 2.0." He served as an officer of Join the Impact MA. He is a long-time  officer of and regular contributor to the Gay and Lesbian Review Worldwide.  Gorton was elected Grand Marshal of the Boston LGBT Pride Parade in the 40th anniversary year of 2010, under the banner of "From Riots to Rights: 40 Years of Progress." In 2011, Gorton authored a research study of hate crimes against the transgender community, focusing on improved law enforcement responsiveness to this under reported phenomenon. He spoke out against the practice of "conversion therapy," which purports to turn gays into straights or change transgender identity. He co-chaired the coalition of organizations which successfully banned conversion therapy for minors in Massachusetts in 2019. He organized events for the Boston Pride Committee in Boston in 2019, for the Stonewall 50 observance.

Gorton was born in Belzoni, Mississippi on May 4, 1960. He attended Humphreys Academy (1978) Boston University (1982) and Harvard Law (1985).

Gorton died suddenly on December 24, 2022 while visiting family in Belzoni, Mississippi.

Works
Direct from the Field: A Guide to Bullying Prevention (co-author with Laura Parker-Roerden and David Rudewick), published by the Massachusetts Department of Public Health in 2008.
 "The Origins of Anti-Sodomy Laws, Harvard Gay & Lesbian Review 10 (1998).
 "Gay Rights in the Clash of Civilizations" (Essay), The Gay & Lesbian Review Worldwide (ISSN 1532-1118) Vol. 9, Iss. 1 (2002-01-01)
 "Timing of Henry VIII's sodomy law matters", The Gay & Lesbian Review Worldwide (ISSN 1532-1118)Vol. 11, Iss. 1 (2004-01-01)
 "What really happened at the Stonewall Inn?", The Gay & Lesbian Review Worldwide (ISSN 1532-1118),  Vol. 11, Iss. 6 (2004-11-01)
 "A Literature of Hope for GLBT Youth," The Gay & Lesbian Review Worldwide Vol. 12, Iss. 6 (2005-11-01)
 "The Hate Crime", The Gay & Lesbian Review Worldwide (ISSN 1532-1118) Vol. 13, Iss. 3 (2006-05-01)
 "Why Stonewall Matters After Forty Years," The Gay & Lesbian Review Worldwide Vol. 16, Iss. 4 (2009-07-01)
 "Maurice and Gay Liberation," The Gay & Lesbian Review Worldwide Vol. 16, Iss. 6 (2009-11-01)
 "Anti-Transgender Hate Crimes: The Challenge for Law Enforcement," The Anti-Violence Project of Massachusetts 2011
 "How 'It Gets Better' Is Making It Better," The Gay and Lesbian Review Worldwide Vol. 18 Iss. 5 (2011-9-1)

See also 
 List of LGBT jurists in the United States

References

 Levin, J. and McDevitt, J., Hate Crimes Revisited: America's War Against Those Who Are Different (Westview Press, 2002). The Executive Order is available at https://web.archive.org/web/20080807210938/http://www.lawlib.state.ma.us/ExecOrders/eo401.pdf Additional background is available at http://www.cga.ct.gov/ps99/rpt/olr/htm/99-r-1013.htm 
 National Crime Prevention Council, https://web.archive.org/web/20081023185429/http://www.ncpc.org/topics/hate-bias/strategies/strategy-educating-the-public-about-hate-crimes/

 Archives of the Lesbian/Gay/Bisexual/Transgender Political Alliance of Massachusetts available at http://www.lib.neu.edu/archives/collect/findaids/m91find.htm 
 Political writings archived at http://www.jointheimpactma.com
 "Boston Pride's Grand Marshals Have Been Chosen," Bay Windows May 5, 2010 
 "Anti-Transgender Violence: The Challenge for Law Enforcement," The Anti-Violence Project of Massachusetts 2011/Published at Academia.edu.
Co-Chair of the Massachusetts Coalition to Ban Conversion Therapy for Minors, advocates for passage of Chapter 8 of the Acts of 2019: https://malegislature.gov/Laws/SessionLaws/Acts/2019/Chapter8

External links 
New England Blade: Article - July 19, 2006

1960 births
2022 deaths
21st-century LGBT people
American gay men
Boston University College of Arts and Sciences alumni
Harvard Law School alumni
Lawyers from Boston
LGBT appointed officials in the United States
LGBT judges
LGBT lawyers
Massachusetts state court judges
People from Belzoni, Mississippi
People from Humphreys County, Mississippi